Notothixos subaureus is a species of mistletoe plant in the family Santalaceae; it can be found in eastern Australia.

References

External links 
Australian Parasitic Plants - Santalaceae - Notothixos
Atlas of Living Australia

Flora of Australia
Santalaceae
Taxa named by Daniel Oliver